Pikeville is an unincorporated community in Pike Township in Berks County, Pennsylvania, United States. Pikeville is located near the intersection of Lobachsville Road and Oysterdale Road.

The community's name is derived from Pike Township.

References

External links

Unincorporated communities in Berks County, Pennsylvania
Unincorporated communities in Pennsylvania